Gabriele Bella (1730-1799) was an Italian Baroque painter.

Not much is known about Bella other than through his works. He lived and worked around Venice. He primarily painted buildings and city life.
Sixty-seven canvasses by Gabriel Bella are part of the collections of the Pinacoteca Querini Stampalia.

External links
 Pinacoteca Querini Stampalia

18th-century Italian painters
Italian male painters
1799 deaths
1730 births
18th-century Italian male artists